Clarine Harp  is an American voice actress and the Director of Blu-ray, DVD, and video production at Funimation.

Her performance as Hibari Ginza in the 2006-2007 release of Speed Grapher won her an ADR Award as "Actress of the Month" for October 2006 as voted by members of the websites Dub Review and Anime on DVD.

Harp is also the inspiration for Aubrey Chorde, one of the main characters in the  webcomic Something Positive by her friend R.K. Milholland.  He claims he decided to make the comic after she told him to do "something positive" with his life. She lives and works in the Dallas–Fort Worth metroplex area of Texas. Her hobbies include knitting, crafts and collecting oddities, including creatively styled taxidermy.

Filmography

Anime voice roles
 Aquarion - Esperanza (Ep. 15)
 BECK: Mongolian Chop Squad - Kayo
 Burst Angel - Sei
 Case Closed (FUNimation dub) - Michelle Hamlin, Famke Hotta, Nancy Schmidt, Heidi Xanderbilt
 Casshern Sins - Helene
 Cat Planet Cuties - Sara
 Chaos;Head - Sena Aoi
 Chrome Shelled Regios - Dalseina Che Matelna
 Claymore - Undine
 Corpse Princess - Mizuki Inuhiko
 Dance in the Vampire Bund - Nicole Edelman (Ep. 4)
 Danganronpa 3: The End of Hope's Peak High School - Peko Pekoyama
 D.Gray-man - Mahoja
 El Cazador de la Bruja - Jody "Blue Eyes" Hayward
 Fullmetal Alchemist series - Mrs. Armstrong
 Gangsta - Gina Paulklee
 Ghost Hunt - Teruka Yoshimi
 Hetalia: Axis Powers series - China, Taiwan (The Beautiful World), Female China (Nyotalia)
 Heaven's Lost Property series - Harpy
 Jormungand series - Chiquita
 Jyu Oh Sei - Chen
 Kaze no Stigma - Izumi Kurahashi
 Kiddy Grade - Tweedledee
 Last Exile: Fam, the Silver Wing - Tatiana Wisla
 Michiko & Hatchin - Elis (Ep. 12, 16)
 Negima! series - Kaede Nagase
 One Piece (FUNimation dub) - Banchina (Usopp's Mother), Ms. Monday, Ran
 Origin: Spirits of the Past - Cain's Mom
 Ouran High School Host Club - Tamaki Girl 1 (Ep. 21)
 Panty & Stocking with Garterbelt - Kitagawa (Ep. 5B)
 Riddle Story of Devil - Koko Kaminaga
 Rin ~Daughters of Mnemosyne - Laura
 The Sacred Blacksmith - Evande
 Samurai 7 - Sanae
 Sekirei series - Haihane
 Shakugan no Shana - Tiamat (Seasons 2–3, OVA)
 Shangri-La - Ayako
 Shin-chan (FUNimation dub) - Ms. Katz
 Speed Grapher - Hibari Ginza
 Spice and Wolf II - Adele Cole
 Spiral - Takako Adachi
 Strike Witches 2 - Nishiki Nakajima (Ep. 12)
 The Tower of Druaga - Gremica
 Trinity Blood - Colonel Mary Spencer
 Unbreakable Machine-Doll - Shouko Karyuusai
 Witchblade - Asagi
 Yurikuma Arashi - Him (Ep. 8)
 Yu Yu Hakusho - Kokou, Ryuuhi

References

External links
 
  at DubReview (January 2007)
 
 
  - summary of convention panel

1978 births
American voice actresses
Living people
Actresses from Dallas
21st-century American actresses